The Minnesota Timberwolves are an American professional basketball team based in Minneapolis, Minnesota. They play in the Northwest Division of the Western Conference in the National Basketball Association (NBA). There have been 14 head coaches for the Timberwolves.

The franchise's first head coach was Bill Musselman, who coached for two complete seasons. Musselman, along with Kurt Rambis and Rick Adelman, are the only Timberwolves head coaches to have not been involved in a mid-season replacement. His 819 regular season games coached, 427 regular season wins, 392 regular season losses and his regular season winning percentage of .521 lead all Timberwolves head coaches. Saunders and Adelman are the only two who have been Timberwolves head coach for more than two complete seasons. Saunders returned to the Timberwolves in 2013 as President of Basketball Operations and part-owner, and became head coach once again in 2014.

Though none of the Timberwolves coaches have been elected into the Basketball Hall of Fame as a coach, Kevin McHale has been elected into the Hall of Fame as a player in 1999. McHale coached the Timberwolves in two separate stints, and was the Timberwolves Vice President of Basketball Operations from 1995 to 2009. Sidney Lowe is the only person to have been both a player (1989–1990) and a head coach (1993–1994) for the Timberwolves.

Key

Head coaches

Note: Statistics are current through April 23, 2022.

Head coaches with multiple tenures

Notes
 A running total of the number of coaches of the Timberwolves. Thus, any coach who has two or more separate terms as head coach is only counted once.
 Each year is linked to an article about that particular NBA season.

References
General

Specific

Lists of National Basketball Association head coaches by team

Head coaches